Lobzhanidze or Lobjanidze is a Georgian surname that may refer to:

 Mevlud Lobzhanidze (born 1968), Georgian judoka
 Nugzar Lobzhanidze (born 1971), Georgian footballer
 Ucha Lobjanidze (born 1987), Georgian footballer

Surnames of Georgian origin
Georgian-language surnames